Mount Hotine is a peak  northeast of Mount McKerrow, in the Surveyors Range of Antarctica. It was named by the New Zealand Geological Survey Antarctic Expedition (1960–61) for Brigadier Martin Hotine, British Director of Overseas Surveys at the time.

References

Mountains of the Ross Dependency
Shackleton Coast